The Hudson Community School District is a rural public school district in Hudson, Iowa and serves Hudson and surrounding areas in Black Hawk County.

The school's mascot is the Pirate. Their colors are navy and white.

Schools
The district operates two schools, both in Hudson:
Hudson Elementary School
Hudson High School

See also
List of school districts in Iowa

References

External links
 Hudson Community School District

Education in Black Hawk County, Iowa
School districts in Iowa